= Abdullah Mahmoud al-Khalidi =

- Died: 30 October 2012; Damascus, Syria
- Military career
- Allegiance: Ba'athist Syria
- Branch: Syrian Arab Air Force
- Rank: Major General
- Conflicts: Syrian civil war

Abdullah Mahmoud al-Khalidi (Arabic: عبد الله محمود الخالدي) was a Syrian Armed Forces major general who had been described as "one of Syria's foremost experts in aviation". He was allegedly assassinated by the opposition on 30 October 2012 in the Rukn-Eddin neighborhood of Damascus, after leaving his car. Opposition activists denied this report and claimed that the Syrian government was behind the assassination because al-Khalidi planned to defect.
